John Ebstel (1919–2000) was an American photographer. 

Ebstel was a member of the New York City Photo League, where he also taught photography. His work is included in the collections of the Museum of Fine Arts Houston,  and the Jewish Museum, New York.

References

1919 births
2000 deaths
20th-century American artists
20th-century American photographers
Artists from Philadelphia